Gingipain R (Arg-gingipain, gingipain-1, argingipain, Arg-gingivain-55 proteinase, Arg-gingivain-70 proteinase, Arg-gingivain-75 proteinase, arginine-specific cysteine protease, arginine-specific gingipain, arginine-specific gingivain, RGP-1, RGP) is an enzyme. This enzyme catalyses the following chemical reaction:

 Hydrolysis of proteins and small molecule substrates, with a preference for Arg in P1 (position 1)

This enzyme is secreted cysteine endopeptidase from the bacterium Porphyromonas gingivalis.

See also
 Gingipain
 Gingipain K

References

External links 
 

EC 3.4.22